The Chief of Staff of the Portuguese Navy (acronym: C.E.M.A.) is the head of the Portuguese Navy and of the Maritime Authority System. The CEMA depends on the Minister of National Defense in terms of resources, and on the Army Chief of Staff for preparation and deployment. The current Chief is Admiral Henrique Gouveia e Melo, since 27 December 2021.

List of chiefs 
The following is a list of navy chiefs:

Second Portuguese Republic (1960–1974)

Post Carnation Revolution period (1974–present)

References 

Portugal
Portuguese Navy